Nanyan may refer to:
Nanyan, Iran, a village in Gilan Province
Huang Nanyan (b. 1977), Chinese badminton player
Nanyan Temple, temple in China